This page presents the results of the men's and women's volleyball tournament during the 2006 Central American and Caribbean Games, which was held 15–30 July in Cartagena, Colombia.

Medal summary

* Osmany Juantorena was disqualified for doping.

Men's tournament

Competing nation

Squads

Preliminary round

Group A

 July 24

 July 25

 July 26

Group B

 July 24

 July 25

 July 26

Classification match (7th/8th place)
 July 27

Quarterfinals
 July 27

Classification match (5th/6th place)
 July 28

Final round

Semifinals
 July 28

Finals

Bronze-medal match
 July 29

Gold-medal match
 July 29

Final standings

Awards
 Most Valuable Player:
 
 Best Digger:
 
 Best Libero:
 
 Best Setter:

Women's tournament

Competing nation

Squads

Preliminary round

Group A

 July 16

 July 17

 July 18

Group B

 July 16

 July 17

 July 18

Classification match (7th/8th place)
 July 19

Quarterfinals
 July 19

Classification match (5th/6th place)
 July 20

Final round

Semifinals
 July 20

Finals

Bronze-medal match
 July 21

Gold-medal match
 July 21

Final standings

Awards

 Most Valuable Player:
 
 Best Attacker:
 
 Best Blocker:
 
 Best Digger:
 
 Best Libero:
 

 Best Receiver:
 
 Best Server:
 
 Best Setter:
 
 Best Scorer:

References

External links
 NORCECA Official Site
  Official Results

2006 Central American and Caribbean Games
Central American and Caribbean Games
2006
International volleyball competitions hosted by Colombia